The Kathmandu Rayzrs 2021 season is Kathmandu Rayzrs's 1st Nepal Super League season.

Season overview

On 18th of March, Kathmandu Rayzrs F.C. announced the signing of Nepal national football team Goalkeeper Bikesh Kuthu as its marquee player.

On the Nepal Super League (NSL) auction, Kathmandu Rayzrs FC bought several players such as midfielder Tej Tamang, Bishwash Shrestha, etc.

On 23 April, Kathmandu Rayzrs signed contract with Messouke Oloumou.

On 23 April, Kathmandu Rayzrs signed contract with Stephane Samir.

On 23 April, Kathmandu Rayzrs signed contract with Florent Koara.

Competitions

Nepal Super League

Results

League table

Playoffs

Bracket

Preliminary

Final

Statistics

Goalscorers

Hat-tricks

Awards

NSL Super Midfielder of the League

NSL Nivia Emerging Player of the League

NSL Super Coach of the League

References

External links
Kathmandu RayZers

Nepalese football clubs 2021 season
Nepal Super League
Sport in Kathmandu